Somerset Mall can mean:

Somerset Collection (formerly Somerset Mall), an upscale mall in Michigan
Somerset Mall (South Africa), a large mall located in Somerset West in the Western Cape